Amsinckia vernicosa is a species of fiddleneck known by the common name green fiddleneck.

It is endemic to California, where it is an uncommon member of mountain, desert, and valley habitat in several regions.

Description
Amsinckia vernicosa  is a hairy annual herb somewhat similar to other fiddlenecks, but waxy in texture and pinkish in color along the lower stem.

The coiled inflorescence holds yellow or orange tubular flowers up to 2 centimeters long and 1.5 wide at the corolla.

External links
Jepson Manual Treatment — Amsinckia vernicosa
Amsinckia vernicosa — U.C. Photo gallery

vernicosa
Endemic flora of California
Flora of the California desert regions
Flora of the Sierra Nevada (United States)
Natural history of the California chaparral and woodlands
Natural history of the California Coast Ranges
Natural history of the Central Valley (California)
Natural history of the Mojave Desert
Natural history of the San Francisco Bay Area
Taxa named by William Jackson Hooker
Flora without expected TNC conservation status